Nigerian singer Burna Boy has released six studio albums, two mixtapes, two extended plays, and 39 singles.

Studio albums

Mixtapes 
Burn Notice (2011)
Burn Identity (2012)

Extended plays 
Redemption (2016)
Steel & Copper (with DJDS) (2019)

Singles

As lead artist

As featured artist

Other charted and certified songs

Other guest appearances

Music videos

Notes

References

Discographies of Nigerian artists